The Union of Students in Ireland (USI) is the national representative body for third-level students' unions in Ireland. Founded in 1959, USI represents more than 374,000 students in over forty colleges across the island of Ireland. Its mission is to work for rights of students and a fair and equal third level education system in Ireland.

The Union's ultimate governing body is its Annual Congress, and its executive authority is vested in a its National Council, comprising representatives from each member organisation. Members of the executive team of USI serve a one-year term beginning on 1 July.  the national president was Beth O’Reilly, former Commercial and Fundraising Officer in University College Cork and former Vice President for Campaigns in USI.

A number of past officers of USI have gone on to prominent positions within Irish society. Past USI presidents include former Tánaiste Eamon Gilmore, former Chief Justice John L. Murray (1966/67), and broadcaster Joe Duffy (1983–84).

In Northern Ireland, USI jointly operates NUS-USI with the National Union of Students of the United Kingdom, with students being members of both national unions. USI is a member of European Students' Union, was formerly a member of EURODOC and has provided officer-holders in both organisations.

Structure
The Union of Students in Ireland is an unincorporated body, organised by the affiliated Students' Unions and governed by a constitution.

Annual Congress
The USI's annual congress is its ultimate decision-making body and takes place over a 4-day period around Easter. Affiliated unions send a number of delegates based on the number of students registered in the college to which the union is affiliation to attend congress.  All students' unions can submit motions and amendments at the congress.

Congress debates and votes on the various issues and motions submitted by member colleges. It also elects the officer board for the coming year.

National Council
The national council is USI's executive body, consisting of one representative from each member organisation and USI's full-time and part-time officers. It is convened at least four times a year for the purpose of directing the overall work of the national union, amending the schedules to the constitution and determining interim policies responsive to events. In practice it is convened on a monthly to six-weekly basis.

President and Executive Team
The Executive Team is a standing committee of the national council and is composed of the elected officers of the union. The team provides day-to-day leadership to USI, produces annual plans for, and co-ordinates, its work.

Operational bodies
There are two main non-political operational bodies within USI: the Steering and Elections Committee and the Finance Committee.  The Steering and Elections Committee manages elections and the debate aspect of Congress. Members are elected from among former members of USI. The Chair of National Council is usually drawn from this committee.  The Finance Committee is elected to oversee the finances of the organisation and support the development of systems in the areas of commercial, financial and HR management.

Notable past officers

Chief Justice John L. Murray was USI president in 1966/67 and broadcaster Joe Duffy held the post in 1983–84. Several Irish politicians also started their careers as presidents of USI, including former Labour Party leaders Pat Rabbitte and Eamon Gilmore, and former Chairman of the Labour Party, Colm Keaveney. Annie Hoey held the post from 2016 to 2017 and became the first former woman USI President to be elected to national office during the 2020 Seanad election as the Irish Labour Party candidate for the Agricultural Panel.

Political strategist Frank Flannery, Cambridge University and Yale Professor Denys Turner and barristers Karen Quinliven QC, Grainne McMorrow SC and Giollaiosa O Lideadha SC all served as president, while SDLP Leader Mark Durkan was Deputy President and Minister of State at the Department of Health Alex White TD served on the USI officer board. Broadcaster and journalist Howard Kinlay was the first President of the Students Union in TCD before becoming President of USI. The chain of student hostels owned by USI were called Kinlay House in his honour. Chief Executive of the Labour Relations Commission, Kieran Mulvey, was President of the Students Union in UCD and later Deputy President of USI.

Other members
Other figures that have been involved in the student movement but did not hold elected positions in USI include the ninth President of Ireland Michael D. Higgins (President of the Students' Union in National University of Ireland, Galway (NUI Galway), Supreme Court Justice Adrian Hardiman (President of the Students' Union in University College Dublin), Stormont Minister for the Environment Alex Attwood MLA (President of the Students' Union in Queen's University Belfast), former Minister Séamus Brennan TD (Secretary of the Students' Union in UCG), Labour Senator Ivana Bacik (President of the Students' Union in TCD), Independent Senator Rónán Mullen (President of the Students Union in UCG), Socialist Party TD Clare Daly (President of the Students Union in Dublin City University), Jim Allister MLA (unsuccessful candidate for the Presidency of QUBSU), Fianna Fáil TD Charlie McConalogue (Vice President of the Students' Union in UCD and unsuccessful candidate for the Presidency of USI) and Senator Averil Power (President of the Students' Union in TCD). While Averil Power was president, current Fine Gael TD Lucinda Creighton was active in the USI, although she never held elected office herself. Paul Murphy MEP was an activist in UCD Students' Union, and former TD Patrick Nulty was a member of the Students' Union Executive in UCD Students Union. 

Former Fianna Fáil Senator James Carroll was Education Officer and later President of the Students' Union in UCD; and Mayor of Derry Martin Reilly was a sabbatical officer in Queen's. Christopher Stalford MLA, Lord High Sheriff of Belfast and youngest ever member of Belfast City Council was a prominent activist in Queen's Students' Union and a student representative on the Senate of QUB, and Simon Hamilton, Stormont Finance Minister also represented students on the Senate of Queen's. Jemma Dolan, Sinn Féin MLA for Fermanagh and South Tyrone was vice president for Campaigns and Communications for the University of Ulster Students Union. Political activist and victim of the miscarriage of justice after the Sallins Train Robbery, Osgur Breatnach, was a member of the Students' Representative Council of UCDSU. Irish Ambassador to the United Kingdom Dan Mulhall was Deputy President of the Students Union in University College Cork. Aviation Regulator Cathal Guiomard and Central Bank of Ireland Commissioner Neil Whorisky were both Presidents of UCGSU. Sailing personality Enda O'Coineen was sports officer on UCG's Union Executive, and debt relief activist and campaigner David Hall was vice-president of the Students' Union in Maynooth in the 1990s. David O'Sullivan, later Secretary General of the European Commission, was noted during his student days as a moderate voice in the Students' Union in Trinity College.

Broadcasters and journalists like Aileen O'Meara and Cathy Grieve were both President of the Students Union in UCG. Broadcaster Vincent Browne was an activist and edited USI's monthly news magazine "Nusight" for a period, and barrister, broadcaster and GAA personality Joe Brolly was a member of the Students Union Executive in TCD. Nick Ross was Deputy President at Queen's Students' Union, Ryan Tubridy was involved in UCD Students' Union, Morning Ireland presenter Aine Lawlor was President of the Students Union in TCD as was fellow RTÉ journalist and presenter Mark Little, while broadcaster and journalist Mary Raftery held Students' Union positions in a number of Colleges, culminating in a term as Education Officer in UCD Students' Union, where she was the first full-time female officer in the Students' Union. Eugene Murray, editor of Today Tonight and later head of TV Current Affairs with RTÉ was President of TCD SU in 1971. In 2020 the Deputy President of the USI Michelle Byrne resigned following undercover reporting by a right wing student publication 'The Burkean'.

Controversies
In March 2020 the Deputy President of the Union of Students of Ireland Michelle Byrne resigned after an undercover investigation by the student magazine "The Burkean"

References

External links 
 Official site

Students' unions in Ireland
Groups of students' unions